Max Liebman Presents, aka Max Liebman Spectaculars, is an American television anthology series, presented monthly in a 90-minute format. A total of 28 episodes aired every fourth Sunday (some Saturday) from September 12, 1954, to June 9, 1956, on NBC. Each episode incorporated music and dance and several episodes were dedicated to musical presentations alone. Authors included Neil Simon, Elmer Rice, and Billy Friedberg. Max Liebman produced and directed. Among the guest stars were Judy Holliday, Natalie Wood, Steve Allen, Frank Sinatra, Marcel Marceau, Tony Randall, Ann Sothern and Maurice Chevalier.

The program was sponsored by Oldsmobile. It was nominated for three prime-time Emmy Awards.

References

External links
 
 Max Liebman Presents at CTVA

1950s American anthology television series
1954 American television series debuts
1956 American television series endings
Black-and-white American television shows
NBC original programming